Wendland is a surname. Notable people with the surname include:

August von Wendland (1806–1884), diplomat from the Kingdom of Bavaria
Heinrich Wendland (1791–1869), German botanist (H.L.Wendl.)
Hermann Wendland, German botanist (H.Wendl.)
Johann Christoph Wendland (1755–1828), German botanist (Wendl.)
Paul Wendland (1864–1915), German philologist
Ray Wendland, Ph.D., American petrochemist and educator
Robert Wendland, subject of Wendland v. Wendland an American court case concerning right to life vs. right to die
Scott Wendland, American figure skater
Wolfgang Wendland (born 1962), German musician, actor, film producer and politician
Marcelle von Wendland (born 1970),  British entrepreneur, executive, published author and expert in the area of risk and financial instruments as well as semantic data models and data utilities

German-language surnames